The Syr-Darya dace (Squalius squaliusculus) is a species of ray-finned fish in the family Cyprinidae. It is endemic to the Aral Sea basin.

References

Squalius
Fish described in 1872